The canton of Saint-Antonin-Noble-Val is a former canton in the department of Tarn-et-Garonne in south-central France. It had 4,981 inhabitants (2012). It was disbanded following the French canton reorganisation which came into effect in March 2015. It consisted of 9 communes, which joined the canton of Quercy-Rouergue in 2015.

The canton comprised the following communes:

 Saint-Antonin-Noble-Val
 Castanet
 Cazals
 Féneyrols
 Ginals
 Laguépie
 Parisot
 Varen
 Verfeil

See also 
 Cantons of the Tarn-et-Garonne department

References

Former cantons of Tarn-et-Garonne
2015 disestablishments in France
States and territories disestablished in 2015